Toilet Duck is a brand name of toilet cleaner noted for the duck-shape of its bottle shaped to assist in dispensing the cleaner under the rim. The design was patented in 1980 by Walter Düring from Dällikon, Switzerland. It is now produced by S. C. Johnson & Son.

The Toilet Duck brand can be found in the United States, United Kingdom and other countries around the world. In Germany, it is known as WC-Ente, previously produced by Henkel, and now by S. C. Johnson (Germany). In the Netherlands and Flanders it is called "Wc-eend", in France it is sold as "Canard-WC" and in Italy as "Anitra WC". Meanwhile in Spain, it is sold as "Pato WC", in Portugal as "WC Pato", and in Mexico, Brazil, Colombia and Argentina as "Pato Purific" or simply "Pato". In Indonesia, it is one of the "Bebek" (duck) line of products, such as Bebek Kloset, Bebek Semerbak, Bebek Semerbak Flush, Bebek In Tank, and Bebek Kamar Mandi.

The "Toilet" moniker has been dropped from the name in the UK and Ireland, and the product is now called "Duck". Today, the duck-shaped bottle is sold in North America under the Scrubbing Bubbles brand.

Ingredients 
The following ingredients are part of all Duck toilet-cleaning products:
 L-lactic acid
 Water
 Ethoxylated alcohol
 Xanthan gum
 Sodium laureth sulfate

Depending on variant, various dyes and fragrances are used, such as:
 Liquid Marine: Liquitint Blue Dye, Liquitint Pink AL Dye, 2,6-dimethyl-7-octen-2-ol, 2-methoxy-4-propylphenol, 3,7-dimethyloct-6-enenitrile, coumarin, dipropylene glycol, eucalyptol, geraniol, isobornyl acetate, isobutyl salicylate, linalool.
 Liquid Citrus: Liquitint Orange 157, 2-t-butylcyclohexyl acetate, 3,7-dimethylnona-2,6-dienenitrile, allyl 3-cyclohexylpropionate, decanal, dipropylene glycol, ethyl 2-methylvalerate, gamma-undecalactone, methylbenzyl acetate, tricyclo(5.2.1.02,6)dec-4-en-8-yl acetate, triethyl citrate.
 Liquid Mint: Acid Blue 93, dipropylene glycol, mentha arvensis oil.
 Liquid Pine: Acid Blue #9, FD&C Yellow #5, 2,4-dimethyl-3-cyclohexene carboxaldehyde, 2,6-dimethyl-7-octen-2-ol, 2-methylundecanal, borneol, coumarin, dipropylene glycol, eucalyptol, isobornyl acetate, lauraldehyde, pogostemon cablin oil.

Advertising slogan 
In the Netherlands, the advertising slogan "" ("We, the people at Toilet Duck, recommend Toilet Duck") was used in a campaign that ended in 1996. Over 20 years later, the slogan is still being used as a general saying to dispute the independence of "expert" statements when they align with self-interest.

References

External links 
S. C. Johnson product page

Cleaning products
S. C. Johnson & Son brands
Toilets